Third Way (Catalan: Tercera Via) is a conservative political party in Andorra formed by the Lauredian Union and former members of the Liberal Party. The party is led by Josep Pintat Forné.

History 
The party was founded at the end of 2018 to contest the 2019 general election. The party is formed mainly by the Sant Julià de Lòria-based Lauredian Union and members of the Liberal Party who left the party in 2017. It received support from the Virtus Unita Fortior group, as well.

The former premier Albert Pintat ran as a candidate in the 2019 election and supported the party.

In the 2019 election, the party received the 10.4% of the volts and obtained 4 seats in the General Council, becoming the fourth strongest political party in Andorra.

Third Way is contesting the 2019 local elections in 5 out of 7 parishes.

Election results

References

External links 

 Official website

Political parties in Andorra
Political parties established in 2018
Conservative parties in Europe